The Battle of Studzianki was a tactical engagement between elements of the Soviet Red Army's 2nd Guards Tank Army employed as a cavalry mechanized group of the 1st Belorussian Front, together with Polish 1st Armoured Brigade and elements of the German 9th Army of the Army Group North Ukraine defending the area south of Warsaw. The battle was part of the Operation Bagration.

Battle
 
The 2nd Tank Army was launched through the breach in the German 4th Panzer Army's front between Parczew and Chełm, and bypassing Lublin attempted to find a crossing over the Vistula. It was supported by the  First Polish Army, including its 1st Armoured Brigade. In a hasty encounter battle, the 1st Armoured Brigade was located in the first echelon of the 2nd Tank Army. At the point where the army was able to occupy the Magnuszew bridgehead, the Polish brigade engaged advance elements of the counter-attacking German Fallschirm-Panzer Division 1 Hermann Göring, which had express orders to keep the Red Army from crossing the Vistula. The German counter-attack tried to dislodge the Soviet engineers and the Polish troops providing support for them, behind the Vistula, off the bridgehead.

On the 9th, the Germans captured the village of Grabnowola before attempting to push forward to destroy the Soviet forward elements. Initially achieving some success until an attack by the Polish 3rd Tank Company pushed them back before, on the 11th, an attack from the 1st Tank Company drove them from the village of Studzianki. Fierce fighting ensued as the German attack stalled with the 1st Company being forced to fight for the village more than 7 times until, on the 15th, the majority of German forces were encircled and destroyed. Remaining elements of the German forces continued to fight for another day however, retreated by the 17th.

Aftermath

The battle had been a complete failure for the Germans. Whilst they had initially achieved some success in the battle, pushing all the way to the bridgehead itself, it had been forced back by the Polish counterattack and was costly in terms of men and material. For the Polish and Soviets, the battle had been a resounding success.

Commemoration

To commemorate the battle, in 1969 the name of the village Studzianki was changed to Studzianki Pancerne, the word pancerne meaning armoured in Polish.

There is a small museum in the town focuses on the history of the battle.

References

Battles involving Poland
Conflicts in 1944
Battles of World War II involving Germany
Battles involving the Soviet Union
Battles and operations of the Soviet–German War
Tank battles involving Germany
Tank battles involving Poland
Tank battles involving the Soviet Union

Tank battles of World War II